The A.G. Hunter Cup is a competition in Harness racing. It is contested over 2760 metres at Tabcorp Park in Melbourne, VIC. It was one of the world's richest handicap standing start events, but it is now contested under mobile start conditions. It is currently worth A$500,000. The race was formerly staged at Moonee Valley before Victoria's new home of harness racing was opened at Tabcorp Park, Melton.

Recent Winners

Previous winners
 1949 12½f Silver Peak (NSW) fr F. Culbert 2:11.0
 1950 12½f Amorous (VIC) 24y A. R. Gath 2:11.6
 1951 12½f Avian Derby (NSW) fr S. W. Bray 2:10.4
 1952 12½f Floodlight (TAS) fr D. L. Cornish 2:09.4
 1953 12½f New Oro (VIC) fr J. W. King 2:10.2
 1954 12½f Ribands (NSW) 48y P. J. Hall 2:08.2
 1955 12½f Gentleman John (VIC) fr E. J. Rothacker 2:09.6
 1956 12½f Merchant (SA) 12y W. K. Webster 2:10.0
 1957 12½f Mineral Spring (NSW) 12y M. Adams 2:09.2
 1958 14f Radian Venture (SA) 12y F. Connor 2:12.0
 1959 14f Pay Load (VIC) fr W. A. Hickey 2:14.2
 1960 14f Sibelia (NSW) 12y M. Adams 2:07.8
 1961 14f Sheffield Globe (VIC) fr W. Shinn 2:10.2
 1962 14f Sheffield Globe (VIC) 12y W. Shinn 2:09.6
 1963 14f Idle Raider (NSW) fr P. J. Ryan 2:10.0
 1964 14f Minuteman (SA) fr E. R Hurley 2:09.2
 1965 14f Stormy Bruce (NSW) fr B. J. Forrester 2:08.0
 1966 14f Minuteman (SA) 12y E. R. Hurley 2:08.8
 1967 14f Waitaki Hanover (NZ) 24y D. J. Townley 2:06.6
 1968 14f.36y Bon Adios (SA) fr W. Shinn 2:08.8
 1969 14f.36y Golden Alley (TAS) fr H. Pullen 2:07.8
 1970 14f.36y Adios Court (SA) fr C. J. Webster 2:07.0
 1971 14f.36y Son of Nancy (VIC) fr N. Welsh 2:07.6
 1972 14f.36y Dixie Boy (NSW) fr J. L. Young 2:09.0
 1973 14f.36y Monara (VIC) fr D. V. Dove 2:11.0
 1974 2,851m Monara (VIC) fr D. V. Dove 2:07.9
 1975 2,851m Royal Gaze (VIC) fr K. Pocock 2:07.5
 1976 2,851m Truant Armagh (VIC) fr B. Gath 2:10.4
 1977 2,900m *  Pure Steel (WA) fr J. Retzlaff 2:04.6
 1978 2,800m *  Pure Steel (WA) fr T. Demmler 2:01.7
 1979 2,900m *  Hanna's Boy (VIC) fr H. Hocking 2:06.0
 1980 2,870m *  Pure Steel (WA) fr T. Demmler 2:08.3
 1981 2,870m *  Koala King (NSW) fr B. Gath 2:04.5
 1982 2,870m *  Gammalite (VIC) fr W. B. Clarke 2:05.4
 1983 2,870m *  Popular Alm (VIC) fr V. J. Knight 1:59.4
 1984 2,870m *  Rapid Frost (NSW) fr M. Cunningham 2:04.0
 1985 2,870m *  Preux Chevalier (WA) fr B. Perkins 1:58.5
 1986 2,380m Village Kid A C Lewis 1:59.4
 1987 2,380m Trunkey Sting T B Warwick 2:00.8
 1988 2,380m Sir Reilly V J Knight 1:59.3
 1989 2,380m Victorys Phil T Mahar 2:00.2
 1990 2,380m Our Brenray T L O’Sullivan 2:02.3
 1991 2,380m Odds Torado S D Dove 2:01.0
 1992 – not run
 1993 2,840m Master Musician R J Dunn 2:02.8
 1994 3,280m Blossom Lady A M Butt 2:01.1
 1995 3,280m Blossom Lady A M Butt 2:00.6
 1996 3,280m Vics Vance B Purdon 2:03.4
 1997 3,280m Surprise Package A G Herlihy 2:02:4*
 1998 3,280m Try a Fluke Brian Hancock 2:02.5
 1999 3,280m Paris Affair C A Alford 2:04.3
 2000 3,020m Yulestar Tony Shaw 2:01.3
 2001 3,050m Another Party M B Reed 2:01.4
 2002 3,050m Safe and Sound L J Justice 2:01.9
 2003 3,050m Mont Denver Gold C A Alford 2:02.6
 2004 3,050m Mister D G A M Butt 2:03.5

See also

 Australian Pacing Championship
 Chariots of Fire
 Inter Dominion Pacing Championship
 Miracle Mile Pace
 New Zealand Trotting Cup
 Queensland Pacing Championship
 Victoria Cup
 Harness racing in Australia

References

External links
 A G Hunter Cup Website

Harness races in Australia
Australasian Grand Circuit Races